Removable may refer to:
 Removable media, computing/electronic data storage
 Removable partial denture, dentistry
 Removable User Identity Module (R-UIM), telecommunication

In mathematical analysis
 Removable discontinuity
 Removable set
 Removable singularity

See also
 Removal (disambiguation)
 Remove (disambiguation)